The 1919 Rock Island Independents season was the last time that the team played independently, before joining the early National Football League the following year. The team posted a 9–1–1 record and proclaim themselves "Champions of the USA".

Schedule

Game notes

References
Pro Football Archives: 1919 Rock Island Independents season

Rock Island Independents seasons
Rock Island
Rock Island